Norberto González Miranda (born October 10, 1979 in Cienfuegos, Cuba) is a left-handed pitcher for the Cuban national baseball team and Cienfuegos of the Cuban National Series.

In the 2005-06 Cuban National Series, pitching alongside national team stalwarts Yosvani Pérez and Adiel Palma, González maintained a 3.97 ERA and notched 90 strikeouts in 133 innings. However, his record was only 6-10, as Cienfuegos stumbled to a 35-54 record.

References

External links
 

1979 births
Living people
2009 World Baseball Classic players
Olympic baseball players of Cuba
Baseball players at the 2004 Summer Olympics
Baseball players at the 2007 Pan American Games
Baseball players at the 2008 Summer Olympics
Baseball players at the 2011 Pan American Games
Olympic silver medalists for Cuba
Olympic gold medalists for Cuba
Olympic medalists in baseball
2013 World Baseball Classic players
Medalists at the 2008 Summer Olympics
2015 WBSC Premier12 players
Medalists at the 2004 Summer Olympics
Pan American Games gold medalists for Cuba
Pan American Games bronze medalists for Cuba
Pan American Games medalists in baseball
Medalists at the 2011 Pan American Games
People from Cienfuegos